The Rural Municipality of Shell Lake No. 495 was a rural municipality (RM) in Saskatchewan. It was originally formed as the RM of Shell River No. 495 before changing its name to the RM of Shell Lake No. 495 on November 30, 1935. Shell Lake No. 495 was dissolved on December 31, 1953. It was absorbed by the RM of Spiritwood No. 496. It originally comprised nine townships.

References

External links 
Saskatchewan Association of Rural Municipalities

Shell Lake No. 495
Spiritwood No. 496, Saskatchewan
Division No. 16, Saskatchewan